Leslie Stuart Huntington (14 May 1892 – 29 October 1968) was an Australian rules footballer who played with Collingwood in the Victorian Football League (VFL).

He had two brothers, Stan and Jack, who also played VFL football, both playing for Melbourne.

Notes

External links 

		
Les Huntington's profile at Collingwood Forever

1892 births
1968 deaths
Australian rules footballers from Victoria (Australia)
Collingwood Football Club players
Coburg Football Club players